Austrian Open may refer to:
Austrian International, a badminton tournament.
Austrian Open (tennis)
Austrian Open (golf)
Austrian Open (snooker)
Austrian Open (table tennis), latest being 2018 Austrian Open (table tennis)

                                                                                                                                            -->